No. 322 (Dutch) Squadron of the Royal Air Force was a fighter squadron during the Second World War.

Formed with Dutch personnel already flying with the RAF, during the war it formed part of the Air Defence of Great Britain and formed part of the defences against V-1 flying bombs. In the last year of the war, it moved to the continent. After the war, it was disbanded as an RAF unit, but the 322e Jachtvliegtuig Afdeling of the Netherlands armed forces was formed from the squadron.

History
No. 322 Squadron of the Royal Air Force was formed from the Dutch personnel of No. 167 Squadron RAF on 12 June 1943 at RAF Woodvale. The squadron retained the code-letter combination VL which had been used previously by No. 167 Squadron until late June 1944, when it was changed to 3W. It served at RAF West Malling and other stations during the Second World War.

From 20 June to 9 August 1944, and equipped with Spitfire Mk XIVs, the squadron was tasked with intercepting the V-1 Flying Bomb "doodlebug" missiles launched from the Dutch and French coasts towards London. Flying Officer  was the most outstanding pilot on these 'anti-diver' patrols, claiming five of the missiles in one 90 minute flight on 8 July 1944. The total for the squadron was 108.5 destroyed.

On 7 October 1945, the squadron disbanded at Wunstorf in Germany as part of the RAF. In recognition of the squadron's wartime record, the squadron was reestablished at Twente Airbase on 27 September 1946 as the 322e Jachtvliegtuig Afdeling (Fighter Division) of the Royal Netherlands Army.

The Dutch No. 322 Squadron RNLAF is officially considered as the continuation of No. 322 (Dutch) Squadron, keeping its motto and mascot "Polly Grey", the parrot.

Aircraft operated

Commanding officers

Squadron bases

See also
 List of Royal Air Force aircraft squadrons
 Royal Netherlands Air Force

References

Notes

Bibliography

 Appeldorn, Filip. 40 Jaar 322 Squadron, 1943–1983 (in Dutch). Klu 322, 1983. 
 Halley, James J. The Squadrons of the Royal Air Force. Tonbridge, Kent, UK: Air-Britain (Historians) Ltd., 1980. .
 Halley, James J. The Squadrons of the Royal Air Force & Commonwealth 1918–1988. Tonbridge, Kent, UK: Air Britain (Historians) Ltd., 1988. .
 Jefford, C.G. RAF Squadrons, a Comprehensive Record of the Movement and Equipment of all RAF Squadrons and their Antecedents since 1912. Shrewsbury, Shropshire, UK: Airlife Publishing, 2001. .
 Kock, W.J.E. 25 Jaar 322 (in Dutch). Klu 322, 1968.
 Oxspring, Group Captain R.W. DFC. Spitfire Command. London: William Kimber, 1984 (republished by Cerberus Publishing in 2000 and 2005).
 Rawlings, John. Fighter Squadrons of the RAF and their Aircraft. London: Macdonald and Jane's Publishers Ltd., 1969 (second edition 1976). .
 Sorgedrager, Bart and W.H. Lutgert. 322 Squadron, Sporen van zijn Verleden, Lijnen in zijn Geschiedenis (in Dutch). Ministerie van Defensie, 1993.
 Van der Stok, Bob. Oorlogsvlieger van Oranje (in Dutch). Bussum, the Netherlands: Uitgeverij De Haan, 1980 (reprinted 1983). . 
 Translated as War Pilot of Orange. Missoula, Montana: Pictorial Histories Pub Co, 1987. .

External links

 Rafweb
 Page on 322 Squadron in English
 Air War Portal
 No. 322 (Dutch) RAF Squadron
In Dutch
 unofficial 322nd squadron website (in Dutch)
 Dutch Airforce page about 322 Squadron
 Another Dutch Airforce page about 322 Squadron
 Aviation Group Leeuwarden

322 Squadron
Military units and formations established in 1943
Military units and formations disestablished in 1945
Military units and formations of the Netherlands in World War II
Netherlands–United Kingdom military relations